Stadionul Comunal is a multi-purpose stadium in the village of Valea Ursului, Bascov commune, Romania. It is currently used mostly for football matches. It is the home ground of Unirea Bascov and holds 2,000 people (400 seats).

References

External links
Stadionul Comunal (Valea Ursului) at soccerway.com

Football venues in Romania
Sport in Argeș County
Buildings and structures in Argeș County